Alias the Jester is a British animated series created by Cosgrove Hall Films, airing in 13 episodes on ITV starting on 13 November 1985. The Australian Broadcasting Corporation aired the show in 1987 during their after school timeslot and is considered one of the Classic ABC shows. GBC TV in Gibraltar aired the series several times in the late 1980s, mainly as a filler during the children's 6:30pm–7:30pm weekday slot.

Synopsis
The show follows the adventures of a time traveller by the name of Alias and his dog-like companion Boswell. After their malfunctioning ship gets stuck in the Earth's magnetic pole, they crash-land in a Middle Age kingdom called Houghton Bottoms, ruled by the diminutive King Arthur and his Queen Edith. Taking up a secret identity of sorts as Alias the Jester, he gains employment at the court and befriends the bumbling court wizard Meredith. When the situation calls for it, Alias instantly changes back into his red uniform, which enables him to fly, and a degree of super strength, which he can use to face the various villains of the show. Each episode inevitably ends with Arthur firing Alias and Meredith (exception being the initial episode in which Arthur proclaims "you're hired").

Characters
Alias the Jester – A "time traveller bold" as said in the title track. After crashing in the Middle Ages he gets a job as a jester for King Arthur. He also fights crime as the Red Knight, who the wizard Meredith believes he summoned. Alias is a stereotypical hero in many ways, possessing an urge to do what is right, however he also has a distinct but subtle sarcastic edge, which he sometimes uses in conversation, especially with Meredith. The feathers on his head appear to be part of his head rather than his suit as they are seen moving and could be the source of his flight.

Boswell – Alias' dog-like alien companion, apparently possessing a fairly high intellect as he is able to understand Alias and take orders. He is, however, only able to communicate with beeping and honking sounds, which presumably make up his language. Often he is among the first to sense danger.

Meredith – The bumbling but well-meaning court wizard of King Arthur. In an attempt to save the kingdom from its various enemies, he tried to summon a magical Red Knight. At that moment, completely coincidentally, Alias' ship crashed. From that point on, Meredith believes him to be the hero he had summoned.

Episodes

Home releases

VHS

DVD
The entire series was released on DVD in March 2006 alongside Avenger Penguins.

Voice cast
Richard Briers as Alias, The Black Najjer
Jimmy Hibbert as Boswell, Queen Edith, Sir Pinkly
Myfanwy Talog as Princess Amaranth
Brian Trueman as King Arthur, The Vikings
Brian Wilde as Meredith

Credits
Written by: Brian Trueman
Music: Keith Hopwood, Malcolm Rowe
Layout: Chris Randall, Jean Flynn, Stephen Thomas, Ted Pettengell
Storylines: Tony Garth, Chris Randall
Animation: Dan Whitworth, Denise Heywood, Andy Wilson, Phil McMylor, Meryl Edge, Stephen Thomas, Jean Flynn, Robert Newman, Phil Morris, Kay Widdowson, Janet Nunn, Arthur de Cloedt, George Jackson, Denise McAllister, Gary Owen, Clinton J. Priest, Margaret Riley
Backgrounds: Margaret Riley, Barbara Alcock, Diane Wren, Malcolm Turner, Nick Pratt, Kevin Smith
Special Effects: Roy Huckerby
Painting: Lorraine Thomas, Judy Ringrose, Bev Phillips, Joan Storey, Yasodha Huckerby, Andrea Hancock, Jackie Mitchell, Lynn Hardie, Karen Brumell, Gloria Vassilou, Lesley Scott, Tony McAleese, Edmund Williams, Stephen Simpson, Sue Halliwell, Mark Povey, Andy Wilson, Simon White, Yasodha Gopal, Stephania Giani
Camera: Frank Hardie, Wendy Hardie, Wendy Senior, Peter Kidd, Phil Atack, Mark Sutton
Editing: Nigel Rutter, Nibs Senior, Zyggy Markiewicz, Jane Hicks, Stephen Perry, David Crompton
Assistant Director: Jean Flynn
Production Supervisor: Bob Burrows
Executive Producer: John Hambley
Produced by: Brian Cosgrove, Mark Hall
Directed by: Chris Randall
© Cosgrove Hall Productions Ltd MCMLXXXV, MCMLXXXVI
Thames Colour Production

External links
 Toonhounds entry on Alias the Jester
 

1985 British television series debuts
1986 British television series endings
1980s British children's television series
Television series based on Arthurian legend
British children's animated action television series
British children's animated superhero television series
ITV children's television shows
Animated television series about extraterrestrial life
Fictional jesters
Television series by FremantleMedia Kids & Family
Television shows produced by Thames Television
English-language television shows
1980s British animated television series
BAFTA winners (television series)
Television series by Cosgrove Hall Films